Krissy Badé (born 31 July 1980 in Paris, France) is a French basketball player. Bade has had 59 selections on the French national women's basketball team from 2002 to 2007.

External links
 Sports reference federation francaise de basket-ball 

French women's basketball players
Basketball players from Paris
Living people
1980 births
France women's national basketball team players
21st-century French women